WHO Disease Staging System for HIV Infection and Disease in Adults and Adolescents was first produced in 1990 by the World Health Organization and updated in September 2005. It is an approach for use in resource limited settings and is widely used in Africa and Asia and has been a useful research tool in studies of progression to symptomatic HIV disease.

Following infection with HIV, the rate of clinical disease progression varies enormously between individuals. Many factors such as host susceptibility and immune function, health care and co-infections, as well as factors relating to the viral strain  may affect the rate of clinical disease progression.

Revised World Health Organization (WHO) Clinical Staging of HIV/AIDS For Adults and Adolescents (2005)
(This is the interim African Region version for persons aged 15 years or more who have had a positive HIV antibody test or other laboratory evidence of HIV infection)
(The United Nations defines adolescents as persons aged 10−19 years but for surveillance purposes, the category of adults and adolescents comprises people aged 15 years and over)

Primary HIV infection
 Asymptomatic
 Acute retroviral syndrome

Clinical stage 1
 Asymptomatic
 Persistent generalized lymphadenopathy

Clinical stage 2
 Moderate and unexplained weight loss (<10% of presumed or measured body weight)
 Recurrent respiratory tract infections (such as sinusitis, bronchitis, otitis media, pharyngitis)
 Herpes zoster
 Recurrent oral ulcerations
 Papular pruritic eruptions
 Angular cheilitis
 Seborrhoeic dermatitis
 Onychomycosis (fungal nail infections)

Clinical stage 3

Conditions where a presumptive diagnosis can be made on the basis of clinical signs or simple investigations
 Unexplained chronic diarrhoea for longer than one month
 Unexplained persistent fever (intermittent or constant for longer than one month)
 Severe weight loss (>10% of presumed or measured body weight)
 Oral candidiasis
 Oral hairy leukoplakia
 Pulmonary tuberculosis (TB) diagnosed in last two years
 Severe presumed bacterial infections (e.g. pneumonia, empyema, meningitis, bacteraemia, pyomyositis, bone or joint infection)
 Acute necrotizing ulcerative stomatitis, gingivitis or periodontitis

Conditions where confirmatory diagnostic testing is necessary
 Unexplained anaemia (< 80 g/L), and or neutropenia (<500/μl) and or thrombocytopenia (<50 000/ μl) for more than one month

Clinical stage 4

Conditions where a presumptive diagnosis can be made on the basis of clinical signs or simple investigations
 HIV wasting syndrome
 Pneumocystis pneumonia
 Recurrent severe or radiological bacterial pneumonia
 Chronic herpes simplex infection (orolabial, genital or anorectal of more than one month's duration)
 Esophageal candidiasis
 Extrapulmonary tuberculosis
 Kaposi's sarcoma
 Central nervous system toxoplasmosis
 HIV encephalopathy

Conditions where confirmatory diagnostic testing is necessary
 Extrapulmonary cryptococcosis including meningitis
 Disseminated non-tuberculous mycobacteria infection
 Progressive multifocal leukoencephalopathy
 Candida of trachea, bronchi or lungs
 Cryptosporidiosis
 Isosporiasis
 Visceral herpes simplex infection
 Cytomegalovirus (CMV) infection (retinitis or of an organ other than liver, spleen or lymph nodes)
 Any disseminated mycosis (e.g. histoplasmosis, coccidiomycosis, penicilliosis)
 Recurrent non-typhoidal salmonella septicaemia
 Lymphoma (cerebral or B cell non-Hodgkin)
 Invasive cervical carcinoma
 Visceral leishmaniasis

Original proposal in 1990

Clinical Stage I
 Asymptomatic
 Generalised lymphadenopathy
 In some cases symptoms similar to those of cold flue would be manifested.
Performance scale: 1: asymptomatic, normal activity.

Clinical Stage II
 Weight loss, < 10% of body weight
 Minor mucocutaneous manifestations (seborrheic dermatitis, prurigo, fungal nail infections, recurrent oral ulcerations, angular cheilitis)
 Herpes zoster within the last five years
 Recurrent upper respiratory tract infections (i.e. bacterial sinusitis)

And/or performance scale 2: symptomatic, normal activity.

Clinical Stage III
 Weight loss, > 10% of body weight
 Unexplained chronic diarrhoea > 1 month
 Unexplained prolonged fever (intermittent or constant), > 1 month
 Oral [candidiasis] ([thrush])
 Oral hairy leucoplakia
 Pulmonary tuberculosis
 Severe bacterial infections (i.e. pneumonia, pyomyositis)

And/or performance scale 3: bedridden < 50% of the day during last month.

Clinical Stage IV
The declaration of AIDS
 HIV wasting syndrome *
 Pneumocystis carinii pneumonia
 Toxoplasmosis of the brain
 Cryptosporidiosis with diarrhoea > 1 month
 Cryptococcosis, extrapulmonary
 Cytomegalovirus disease of an organ other than liver, spleen or lymph node (ex: retinitis)
 Herpes simplex virus infection, mucocutaneous (>1 month) or visceral
 Progressive multifocal leucoencephalopathy
 Any disseminated endemic mycosis
 Candidiasis of esophagus, trachea, bronchi
 Atypical mycobacteriosis, disseminated or lungs
 Non-typhoid Salmonella septicemia
 Extrapulmonary tuberculosis
 Lymphoma
 Kaposi's sarcoma
 HIV encephalopathy **

And/or performance scale 4: bedridden > 50% of the day during last month.

(*) HIV wasting syndrome: weight loss of > 10% of body weight, plus either unexplained chronic diarrhoea (> 1 month) or chronic weakness and unexplained prolonged fever (> 1 month).

(**) HIV encephalopathy: clinical findings of disabling cognitive and/or motor dysfunction interfering with activities of daily living, progressing over weeks to months, in the absence of a concurrent illness or condition other than HIV infection which could explain the findings.

References

HIV/AIDS
World Health Organization